Mongane Wally Serote (born 8 May 1944) is a South African poet and writer. He became involved in political resistance to the apartheid government by joining the African National Congress (ANC) and in 1969 was arrested and detained for several months without trial. He subsequently spent years in exile, working in Botswana, and later London, England, for the ANC in their Arts and Culture Department, before eventually returning to South Africa in 1990. He was inaugurated as South Africa's National Poet Laureate in 2018.

Mongane Wally Serote was born in Sophiatown, Johannesburg, 1944, just four years before the National Party (South Africa) came to power in South Africa. His early education took place in the poverty-stricken township of Alexandra and later at Morris Isaacson High School – the school in Jabavu, Soweto and Sacred Heart Commercial High School, Lesotho. He first became involved in the Black Consciousness Movement when he was finishing high school in Soweto. His presence in that town linked him to a group known as the "township" or "Soweto" poets, and his poems often expressed themes of political activism, the development of black identity, and violent images of revolt and resistance. He was arrested by the apartheid government under the Terrorism Act in June 1969 and spent nine months in solitary confinement, before being released without charge. He went to study in New York City, obtaining a Fine Arts degree at Columbia University.

After contributing poems to various journals, in 1972 he published his first collection, Yakhal'Inkomo. It won the Ingrid Jonker Poetry Prize in 1973.

He was a Fulbright Scholar and received a fine arts degree from Columbia University in 1979. He was not able to return to South Africa and he began a life in exile, Serote remained in voluntary exile, going to Botswana in 1977 where he rejoined the ANC underground and its military wing, uMkhonto we Sizwe (MK). living in Gaborone, Botswana, where he was involved in the Medu Art Ensemble, and in London, where he relocated in 1986 and worked for the ANC's Department of Arts and Culture.

He returned to South Africa in 1990, after the ANC was unbanned. In 1993, he won the Noma Award for Publishing in Africa. In 2004, he received the Pablo Neruda award from the Chilean government.

Serote held a variety of positions in the ANC, returning to South Africa in 1990, when he was appointed Head of the Department of Arts and Culture of the ANC in Johannesburg. He has also served as chair of the parliamentary select committee for arts and culture. Serote was awarded honorary doctorates from the universities of KwaZulu-Natal and Transkei. Until recently he was a Member of Parliament and Chairman of the Portfolio Committee for Arts, Culture, Language, Science and Technology.

He has served as chair of the parliamentary select committee for arts and culture, and was also the CEO of Freedom Park, a national heritage site in Pretoria opened in 2007. He has founded a few NGOs, iIKSSA Trust where he is the Chairperson, IARI which he is also the CEO. He sits on a few advisory boards in the country dealing with Arts, Culture, Indigenous Knowledge and African Renaissance issues.

In 2018, Serote was announced as the National Poet Laureate of South Africa, following the death of Keorapetse Kgositsile.

Awards
1973 - Ingrid Jonker Poetry Prize for the best debut collection in English
1993 - Third World Express wins the Noma Award for publishing in Africa
2003 - The English Academy of Southern Africa Medal for contribution to the English language
2004 - Pablo Neruda Medal for Writing
2007 - The Order of Ikhamanga in Silver, awarded for "Excellent contribution to literature, with emphasis on poetry and for putting his artistic talents at the service of democracy in South Africa"
2008 - Third World Express selected for Africa Book Centre’s 100 Best Books of the Twentieth Century
2012 - Struga Night Awards: Poet Laureate Of Macedonia

Writings

Poetry

City Johannesburg (1971) 
Alexandra (1972)
Yakhal'inkomo (1972)
Beerhall Queen (1972)
For Don M- Banned (1973)
A Sleeping Black Boy
Tsetlo (1974)
No Baby Must Weep (1975)
Behold Mama, Flowers (1978)
The Night Keeps Winking (1982)
A Tough Tale (1987)
No More strangers (1989)
Third World Express (1992)
Come and Hope With Me (1994)
Freedom Lament and Song (1997)
History is the Home Address (2004)

Novels
To Every Birth Its Blood (1981)
Gods of Our Time (1999)
Scatter the Ashes and Go (2002)
Revelations (2011)
Sikhahlel' u-OR (2019)

Essays
On the Horizon (1990)

See also

Alexandra
List of African writers
List of South African poets

References

1944 births
Living people
South African poets
Anti-apartheid activists
People from Johannesburg
South African male novelists
Columbia University School of the Arts alumni
Struga Poetry Evenings Golden Wreath laureates
Male poets
20th-century poets
Recipients of the Order of Ikhamanga
South African chief executives
20th-century South African male writers
21st-century South African male writers
Poets laureate
Fulbright alumni